Liam Hannu Holohan (born 22 February 1988 in Leeds) is a British former professional cyclist from England, who currently works as a directeur sportif for UCI Continental team .

Major results
2013
 9th Overall Tour de Taiwan
2014
 1st Stage 7 An Post Rás
2015
 7th Overall Kreiz Breizh Elites
 8th Beaumont Trophy
2016
 5th Ryedale Grand Prix
 9th Overall Tour de Slovaquie

References

External links

1988 births
Living people
English male cyclists
Sportspeople from Leeds